HMS St Vincent was a 120-gun first-rate ship of the line of the Royal Navy, laid down in 1810 at Devonport Dockyard and launched on 11 March 1815.

Service
She was one of class of three, and the only one to see active service, though she was not put into commission until 1829, when she became the flagship of William Carnegie, 7th Earl of Northesk, under Northesk's flag captain, Edward Hawker, at Devonport (aka Plymouth-Dock) Dockyard. After paying-off in April 1830 she was recommissioned the following month and was made flagship at Portsmouth Dockyard. From 1831 until 1834 she served in the Mediterranean.

On 18 February 1834, St Vincent was at Malta when the British merchant schooner Meteor was destroyed there by the explosion of her cargo of gunpowder with the loss of 28 lives. The explosion severely damaged St Vincent and drove her aground. She was refloated on 21 February 1834 after unshipping all 120 of her cannon. and subsequently was repaired and returned to service.

Placed on harbour service at Portsmouth in 1841, St Vincent joined the Experimental Squadron in 1846. From May 1847 until April 1849 she was the flagship of Rear-Admiral Sir Charles Napier, commanding the Channel Fleet.

After a spell in ordinary at Portsmouth, from July to September 1854, during the Crimean War, she was used to transport French troops to the Baltic. Subsequently she became a depot ship at Portsmouth. She was driven ashore there on 11 January 1862, but was refloated. She was commissioned as a training ship in 1862, and specifically as a training ship for boys, moored permanently at Haslar from 1870. In this role she retained 26 guns. She continued as a training ship until 1905. Commander Cecil Thursby was in command from April 1899, succeeded by Commander Bentinck J. D. Yelverton from January 1902. The final commander was G. C. Cayley, who captained the ship from 1904 until her decommissioning in 1906. She was broken up in Falmouth Docks and one of her anchors was put on display near Gyllyngvase Beach in Falmouth.

Fate
St Vincent was sold out of the service in 1906 for breaking up.

Notes

References
 
 
 Lavery, Brian (2003) The Ship of the Line - Volume 1: The development of the battlefleet 1650-1850. Conway Maritime Press. .

 

Ships of the line of the Royal Navy
Nelson-class ships of the line
1815 ships
Maritime incidents in February 1834